Share My Love may refer to:

 Share My Love (album), a 1973 album by Gloria Jones
 "Share My Love" (song), a 2012 song by R. Kelly